Viya may refer to:
Viya, a form of the first name Abijah
Viya language, a minor Bantu language of Gabon
Viya!, 2001 solo album by Kâzım Koyuncu, Georgian singer-songwriter
Viya (company), an American telecommunications company owned by ATN International
Viya (influencer), a social media personality